Odile of Alsace, also known as Odilia and Ottilia, born c. 662 - c. 720 at Mont Sainte-Odile), is a saint venerated in the Catholic Church and the Eastern Orthodox Church. She is a patroness saint of good eyesight and of the region of Alsace.

Biography

Odile was the daughter of Etichon (also known as Athich, Adalrich or Aldaric), Duke of Alsace and founder of the Etichonid noble family. According to the 9th century "Life of Odilia", she was born blind. Her father did not want her because she was a girl and handicapped, so her mother Bethswinda had her brought to Palma (perhaps present day Baume-les-Dames in Burgundy), where she was raised by peasants there.

A tenth-century legend relates that when she was twelve, Odile was taken into a nearby monastery.  Whilst there, the itinerant bishop Erhard of Regensburg was led, by an angel it was said, to Palma where he baptised her Odile (Sol Dei), whereupon she miraculously recovered her sight.  Her younger brother Hughes had her brought home again, which enraged Etichon so much that he accidentally killed his son. Odile miraculously revived him, and left home again.

She fled across the Rhine to a cave or cavern in one of two places (depending on the source:  the Musbach valley near Freiburg im Breisgau, Germany, or Arlesheim near Basel, Switzerland.) Supposedly, the cliff face opened up in order to rescue her from her plight.  In the cave, she hid from her father. When he tried to follow her, he was injured by falling rocks and gave up.

When Etichon fell ill, Odile returned to nurse him. He finally gave up resisting his headstrong daughter and founded the Augustine monastic community of Mont Ste. Odile (also known as Hohenburg Abbey) for her. in the Hochwald (Hohwald), Bas-Rhin, where Odile became abbess and where Etichon was later buried. Some years later Odile was shown the site of Niedermünster at the foot of the mountain by St. John the Baptist in a vision.  There she founded a second monastery, including a hospital. Here, the head and an arm of St. Lazarus of Marseille were displayed but later transferred to Andlau. The buildings of the Niedermünster burned down in 1542, but the local well is still said to cure eye diseases.

St. Odile died about 720 at the convent of Niedermünster. At the insistent prayers of her sisters she was returned to life, but after describing the beauties of the afterlife to them, she took communion by herself and died again. She was buried at Ste. Odile.

Veneration

The cult of St. Odile spread rapidly, and spread outside France to Germany.  She was mentioned in the litanies of Freising, Utrecht and Ratisbon at least from the 9th century.  Amongst the common people, pilgrimages to her shrine were popular, and were by no means limited to the masses; from Charlemagne onwards, emperors also conducted pilgrimages in her honour. Indeed, Charlemagne granted immunity to the convent at Hohenberg, which was later officially ratified by Louis the Pious on 9 March 837.

By the 14th century, Odile's cult had grown so strong that her relics were split and removed to Corbie, Prague and Einsiedeln.  She enjoyed especial popularity in Strasbourg.  The strength of her cult is supposed to have been a result of her patronage of the blind and partially sighted, which was especially pertinent in a time before the invention of spectacles.

St. Odile was long considered the patron of Alsace and eye patients, at least since before the 16th century; however, this was made official in 1807 by pope Pius VII. Her feast day is 13 December.

Cultural representations

As the patroness of ocular afflictions and ear diseases, St. Odile is often depicted with a pair of eyes on a book - particularly fine examples of such images can be found from the 14th-16th centuries.  A notable sculpture of her exists at the Bavarian National Museum in Munich, which portrays the event of her baptism.  The larkspur is connected to St. Odile as well and is believed to cure eye diseases in popular medicine and superstition.

A Life of St. Odilia was written about the 10th century, mostly dedicated to the retelling of her legend, the antagonism of her father, and the death of her brother Hughes.  From internal evidence, it seems that it was based upon an earlier, 8th century Life; however, as an account of her life, it cannot be considered to have much historical validity.

Legacy
Mont Sainte-Odile in Alsace, is named for her.

Places dedicated to Saint Odile

St. Odile pilgrim's chapel, near Freiburg
In the valley of the Musbach, a small river that runs near Freiburg im Breisgau, pilgrims have venerated St. Odile for centuries. In ca. 1300 a chapel was built; the present church was started in 1503 and finished in the 18th century. The church is built adjacent to a spring whose water contains radon, which is supposedly beneficial to eyesight. In the 18th century the spring became part of the church building: in 1714 the source was included by enlarging the building, in 1780 the cave with the source in it was renovated and decorated in the fanciful style of the time.

Places where she had been
 Barr, Bas-Rhin, Alsace, France
 Freiburg, Baden-Württemberg, Germany: St. Odile's Church
 Arlesheim, Basel-Landschaft, Switzerland

Other places dedicated to her
 Absberg, Bavaria, Germany (St. Odile's Church )
 Bettringen, Schwäbisch Gmünd, Baden-Württemberg, Germany (St. Odile's Church )
 Buttisholz, Canton of Lucerne, Switzerland (St. Odile's chapel )
 Eppingen, Baden-Württemberg, Germany (St. Odile's Mountain )
 Fehren, Canton of Solothurn, Switzerland (St. Odile's Church )
 Gohr, Dormagen, North Rhine-Westphalia, Germany (St. Odile's Church )
 Graz, Styria, Austria (St. Odile's Institute for the Blind )
 Hofen, Bönnigheim, Baden-Württemberg, Germany (St. Odile's Church )
 Kersbach, Forchheim, Bavaria, Germany (St. Odile's Church )
 Lörrach, Baden-Württemberg, Germany (St. Odile's Church )
 Losheim am See, Saarland, Germany
 Möschenfeld (Grasbrunn), Bavaria, Germany: St. Odile's Church )
 Offenhausen, Bavaria, Germany (St. Odile's Chapel )
 Paris, France (St. Odile's Church )
 Plochingen, Baden-Württemberg, Germany (St. Odile's Chapel )
 Randegg (Gottmadingen, Baden-Württemberg, Germany (St. Odile's Church )
 Sankt Ottilien, Eresing, Bavaria, Germany (Abbey St. Odile )
 Schorndorf, Baden-Württemberg, Germany (St. Odile's Mountain )
 Stuttgart-Münster, Baden-Württemberg, Germany (St. Odile's Church )
 Walzenhausen, Appenzell Ausserrhoden, Switzerland
 Wengen, Burgheim, Bavaria, Germany (St. Odile's Church )

Gallery

See also

 Etichonids
 Adalrich, Duke of Alsace
 401 Ottilia

References

External links

Short biography of St Odilia of Alsace with many images of statues and old prayer cards
Mont Sainte-Odile
 "The Pagan Wall of the Mount Sainte Odile", Text in basic English French original

Prayers to the patroness of good eyesight
Prayer to St Odilia
Litany of St Odilia

662 births
720 deaths
People from Obernai
Medieval German saints
8th-century Frankish saints
Etichonid dynasty
Female saints of medieval France
Alsatian saints
Colombanian saints
Female saints of medieval Germany
7th-century Frankish women
7th-century Frankish nobility
8th-century Frankish women